The Electoral district of Port Phillip was an electorate of the New South Wales Legislative Council before it became the separate colony of Victoria (Australia) on 1 July 1851. At the time, some members of the Council were elected and the balance were appointed by the Governor. The Town of Melbourne returned one member while the Port Phillip district, which covered the rest of what became Victoria after its separation in 1851, returned five members.

History
Settlers of the Port Phillip District had wanted representation in the New South Wales Legislative Council for some time. In 1843 representatives were elected; "But the colonists were not satisfied with government from and by Sydney".

On 1 July 1851, the District was separated from New South Wales under provisions of the Australian Colonies Government Act 1850, and became the Colony of Victoria and the Victorian Legislative Council was created.

Members

Election results

1843

1844 (1)
Charles Ebden and Alexander Thomson resigned in March 1844.

1844 (2)
Sir Thomas Mitchell, while an elected member was also the Surveyor General. He was criticised by Governor Sir George Gipps for not supporting the government by absenting himself from the Legislative Council when he did not agree with government measures. Mitchell chose to resign his seat.

1845 (1)
Thomas Walker resigned on 31 July 1845.

1845 (2)
Adolphus Young resigned on 31 July 1845.

1845 (3)
Benjamin Boyd resigned on 1 August 1845.

1846 (1)
Thomas Boyd resigned in December 1845.

1846 (2)
Edward Curr resigned in May 1846.

1847
John Lang was absent for two successive sessions of the Council and his seat was declared vacant in November 1847.

1848 By-election
Edward Brewster resigned in February 1848.

1848

1849 (1)
James Williamson resigned in January 1849.

1849 (2)
Edward Curr resigned in May 1849.

1849 (3)
James Palmer resigned in May 1849.

1850
Lauchlan Mackinnon and John Foster resigned in May 1850.

See also
Members of the New South Wales Legislative Council, 1843–1851

References

1847 DIRECTORY FOR THE DISTRICT OF PORT PHILLIP

Former electoral districts of New South Wales Legislative Council
History of Victoria (Australia)
History of New South Wales
1843 establishments in Australia
1851 disestablishments in Australia